The Kolyma Lowland is a lowland plain in the northeastern parts of Sakha Republic in the basin of the Alazeya, Bolshaya Chukoch'ya and lower reaches of the Kolyma rivers. The lowland is formed by fluvio-lacustrine loam soil about 120 m thick. The climate is subarctic.

Geography
The Kolyma Lowland stretches for  along the Kolyma River from the East Siberian Sea to the Chersky Range, between the Alazeya and Yukagir plateaus. Besides the Kolyma, other rivers in the lowland include the Alazeya, its tributary Rossokha, and the Chukochya.

The Kolyma Lowland is part of the wider Yana-Kolyma system of lowlands, which include the Aby to the south of the Polousny Range and the Yana-Indigirka on the northern and western sides.

See also
Northeast Siberian coastal tundra
Pleistocene park

References

East Siberian Lowland